The Smithsonian Asian Pacific American Center (APAC) is a migratory museum that shares Asian Pacific American  history, art, and culture through innovative museum experiences online and throughout the U.S through the Smithsonian Institution's work. The center was established in 1997 and does not feature a museum building for public display; instead, the institution manifests its work through community engagement.

Through exhibitions, programs, research, and collaboration, the APA Center seeks to improve the public's appreciation of the roles of APAs in the history of the nation and empower APA communities by increasing their sense of inclusion into the national culture.  The center has provided leadership, vision, and support for APA activities at the Smithsonian and has also served as the Smithsonian's liaison to APA communities.  The center's founding director, Dr. Franklin Odo, retired in January 2010. Konrad Ng served as director from 2011 to 2015. Lisa Sasaki was appointed director in November 2016.

History 
In 1997, the Smithsonian Asian Pacific American Center established an advisory group headed by Norman Y. Mineta with a mandate to research, deliberate, and then report to Secretary I. Michael Heyman on the Institution's ability to increase and diffuse knowledge about the nation's richly diverse APA communities.

The Asian Pacific American National Advisory Group's final report, released in June 1998, called for the creation of a program for Asian Pacific American Studies. This central program would provide vision, leadership, and support for all APA activities at the Smithsonian, while serving as a liaison to APA communities.

The Smithsonian Asian Pacific American Center has had significant impact on how the Smithsonian, the world’s largest museum complex, is evolving to better reflect the diversity of our nation of immigrants and indigenous peoples. Since its inception, the Smithsonian’s APA Program has sponsored more than a dozen successful exhibitions featuring Japanese, Chinese, Filipino, Indian and Vietnamese Americans, to name a few ethnic groups.

In 2017, the institution published the "Culture Lab Manifesto," which highlights its mission to provide a glimpse into "experiential friction between guests and hosts, history and future." There have been three Culture Labs to date in 2019.

Exhibitions
 'Ae Kai: A Culture Lab on Convergence
 CrossLines: A Culture Lab on Intersectionality 
 CTRL+ALT: A Culture Lab on Imagined Futures 
 Beyond Bollywood: Indian Americans Shape the Nation 
 I Want the Wide American Earth: An Asian Pacific American Story 
 Portraiture Now: Asian American Portraits of Encounter
 Sweet and Sour
 Singgalot: The Ties that Bind
 Exit Saigon, Enter Little Saigon
 Creating Hawaii
 Barriers to Bridges
 Gliding to Golden Vistory—Apolo Ohno's skates
 Japanese American Pioneers of the Jet Age
 Through my Father's Eyes
 Miracle under the Waves
 Do-Ho Suh's Staircase IV
 Dreams and Reality
 A More Perfection Union
 Kaho'olawe: Ke Aloha Kupa'a I Ka'Aina
 On Gold Mountain
 Gateway to Gold Mountain
 Fly to Freedom
 From Bento to Mixed Plate

Staff 
 Director: Yao-Fen You (interim)
 Curator of Digital & Emerging Media: Adriel Luis
 Curator of Asian Pacific American Studies: Lawrence-Minh Búi Davis
 Curator of Hawai’i and the Pacific: Kālewa Correa
 Program Manager: Nafisa Isa 
 Education Specialist: Andrea Kim Neighbors

References

External links 
 Smithsonian Asian Pacific American Center
 

1997 establishments in the United States
Smithsonian Institution research programs
Asian-American culture in Washington, D.C.
Pacific Islands American history